Ron Cahute (born March 26, 1955 in Toronto, Canada) is a Ukrainian-Canadian recording artist and songwriter. He is an accordion player and founding member of the Ukrainian-Canadian music band Burya (English translation: Storm). He is an arranger, sound engineer, music producer, and musical director for Ukrainian dance ensembles in Toronto.

Cahute began his music career in 1962 as a drummer in the band of his late father Maurice Cahute. In 1969, he founded a Ukrainian-Canadian music band, which was later called Burya.

He released over 30 albums either with Burya or as a solo artist. As a guest performer with other music artists he has performed on 178 albums. Cahute has performed with Nana Mouskouri, Sofia Rotaru, Lisa Dalbello, Melissa Manchester, and Catherine McKinnon.

Burya musicians
In its 30+ year history the line-up of Burya musicians has included:

 Ron Cahute: Accordion, Lead Vocals
 Jaroslaw Hryhorsky: Violin, Viola, Trombone, Vocals, Percussion
 Len Steciuk: Guitar, Fiddle, Vocals
 Steve Krachko: Drums
 Bill Hawryschuk: Drums
 David Monis: Drums
 Mark Zubek: Drums
 Michael Monis: Guitar
 Michael Romanick: Tenor Saxophone, Clarinet, Percussion
 Tom Romanick: Saxophone
 Ron Lutz: Alto & Tenor Saxophone, Percussion
 Frank Uhran: Tenor Saxophone, Clarinet, Percussion
 John Lockwood: Flute

Albums

Ron Cahute albums
 Хpиcтoc Paждaєтьcя (1988)
 Ultimate Polka (1989)
 Accordion Music - The Ron Cahute Collection
 Українські Народні Танці (Traditional Ukrainian Folk Dance) (1993)
 Canada's Ukrainian Festival (1997)
 Ron Cahute Generic Volume 1 (1987)
 Ron Cahute Generic Volume 2 (1989)

Ron Cahute & Burya albums
 Sharavarshchyna (2015)

BURYA albums
 Burya I (1979)
 Burya II (1982)
 Burya IIi (1984)
 Burya Live in Toronto (1985)
 Burya V
 Burya Non-Stop Dancing
 Burya Set in Stone
 Burya Live in Edmonton
 Burya Australia Tour (2004)
 Best of Burya
 Burya Now and Then (Double Album)

Recording guest appearances
 Played accordion on "Tango", Lisa Dalbello's "She" album
 Arranged, played keyboards, and co-produced "Paзoм - Visions" (1988)
 Played accordion on "Sailor Song" by Sarah Lentz
 Played accordion on "Heartbroken" by Keisha Prince
 Played accordion on "Amsterdam" by Steve Wildesmith
 Arranged, played all instruments, and co-produced "Bread for my brother" by Oksana
 Arranged, played all instruments, and produced "Nostalgie Di Tutti I Tempi" by Vince Paparo
 Arranged, played accordion, percussion, recorded and co-produced "Blossoming" by Voloshky (1996)
 Arranged, played accordion, recorded and co-produced "Fantazia" by Voloshky (1999)

Ukrainian comedy albums
Ron Cahute has recorded Ukrainian comedy albums with Ihor Baczynskyj including:

 ...And the Garden Goes Here! (1997)

Children educational albums
Ron Cahute has recorded a series of children's educational albums with Ihor Baczynskyj including:

 Barabolya (1997)
 Tsyboolya (1998)
 Booryak and Carrots Too (1999)
 Borscht (1999)
 Barabolya High (2000)

References

External links
 2009 Ron Cahute (Рoман Кoгут) Interview (Part 1)
 2009 Ron Cahute (Рoман Кoгут) Interview (Part 2)
 2009 Рoман Кoгут i Буря: Українська Забава
 1993 Ron Cahute and BURYA in Edmonton
 1984 Ron Cahute and BURYA in New York
 New York Times, DANCE REVIEW; Ukrainian Folk Movements Inspire Canadian Troupe By JACK ANDERSON, Published: Friday, July 7, 1995
 

Canadian composers
Canadian male composers
Canadian people of Ukrainian descent
Canadian accordionists
1955 births
Living people
Canadian folk musicians
Musicians from Toronto
21st-century accordionists
21st-century Canadian male musicians
Ukrainian-language singers